Delhi Skill and Entrepreneurship University (DSEU), is a collegiate public state university located in Delhi, India. It was established in 2020. It offers 15 diploma, 18 undergraduate and 2 postgraduate courses, and has a total of 19 campus in Delhi. The Lieutenant Governor of Delhi serves as the university chancellor.

Established by an Act of the Legislative Assembly of the National Capital Territory of Delhi. It is recognised as a State University by the University Grants Commission (UGC).

History
Delhi Skill and Entrepreneurship University (DSEU) was established as an unitary and teaching university in August 2020 by Government of NCT of Delhi under the provisions of Delhi Skill and Entrepreneurship University Act, 2019. The university is recognised by University Grants Commission (India), under section 12B of the UGC Act.

DSEU was merged with 15 existing government institutes and colleges such as Delhi Institute of Tool Engineering(Wazirpur and Okhla Campus), GB Pant College of Engineering, Integrated Institute of Technology, 10 polytechnics of the Delhi government, and 6 Skill Centres.

Campus
DSEU consists of 19 campuses located across Delhi.

Aryabhatt DSEU Ashok Vihar Campus
DSEU Ashok Vihar campus was formerly known as Aryabhatt Institute of Technology (ABIT) before getting merged with DSEU. ABIT was established in 1962 by Government of NCT of Delhi. This campus is located in Ashok Vihar, North West Delhi.

The courses offered in this campus are Diploma in Architecture, Diploma in Civil Engineering, Diploma in Electrical Engineering, Diploma in Mechanical Engineering, Part-time, Diploma in Civil Engineering, Part-time Diploma in Electrical Engineering, and Part-time Diploma in Mechanical Engineering.

Ambedkar DSEU Shakarpur Campus
Ambedkar Institute of Technology (AIT) after being affiliated to DSEU was renamed to Ambedkar DSEU Shakarpur Campus. AIT was established by Department of Training and Technical Education (DTTE), Government of NCT of Delhi in 1986. It is located in Shakarpur, East Delhi.

The list of courses taught at this campus includes, B.Sc. in Data Analytics, Master in Computer Applications, Diploma in Computer Engineering, and Diploma in Electronics Engineering.

G.B. Pant DSEU Okhla-I Campus
Established in 1961 by Government of NCT of Delhi, Govind Ballabh Pant Institute of Technology was affiliated to DSEU and renamed as G.B. Pant DSEU Okhla-I Campus. It is located in Okhla, South East Delhi.

This campus was previously known as Govind Ballabh Pant Engineering College which was affiliated to guru gobind singh indraprasth university till 2020. It was established in 2007 by the Directorate of Training and Technical Education of the Delhi Government. The college is affiliated to Delhi Skill and Entrepreneurship University (DSEU) from 2021. It is also AICTE approved. Since it is an engineering campus, courses offered in this campus are all engineering courses. They are B.Tech. in Mechanical and Automation Engineering, B.Tech. in Electronics & Communication Engineering, and B.Tech. in Computer Science Engineering.

DSEU Okhla-II Campus
Delhi Institute of Tool Engineering (DITE), which was established was 2007 by Government of NCT of Delhi is now the DSEU Okhla-II Campus. It is located in Okhla, South East Delhi.

DITE being an engineering institute, DSEU Okhla-II Campus offers several engineering courses, which are: B.Tech. in Mechanical Engineering, B.Tech. in Tool Engineering, B.Tech. in Mechatronics, Diploma in Mechanical Engineering, Diploma in Tool & Die Making, and M.Tech. (Tool Engineering).

Guru Nanak Dev DSEU Rohini Campus
DSEU Rohini Campus was previously known as Guru Nanak Dev Institute of Technology. Government of NCT of Delhi established it in 1995. It is located in Rohini, North West Delhi.

The various courses offered in Guru Nanak Dev DSEU Rohini Campus are: Diploma in Chemical Engineering, Diploma in Computer Engineering, Diploma in Electrical Engineering, Diploma in Electronics Engineering, and Diploma in Mechanical Engineering.

DSEU Pusa Campus
DSEU Pusa Campus, which was formerly known as Pusa Institute of Technology (PIT), was established in 1962 by the Government of NCT of Delhi. The campus is located in Pusa, Central Delhi.

The courses offered in this campus are B.Com. in Business Process Management, BBA in Retail Management, Diploma in Automobile Engineering, Diploma in Civil Engineering, Diploma in Electrical Engineering, Diploma in Electronics Engineering, Diploma in Mechanical Engineering, Diploma in Printing Technology, and Part-time Diploma in Automobile Engineering.

DSEU Dwarka Campus
Integrated Institute of Technology Dwarka (IIT Dwarka) was renamed as DSEU Dwarka Campus after its affiliation to DSEU. IIT Dwarka was established by the Government of NCT of Delhi in 2008. It is located in Dwarka, South West Delhi.

Courses offered by this campus are B.A. in Spanish, BBA (Banking, Financial Services and Insurance), BBA in Facilities and Hygiene Management, B.Sc. in Medical Laboratory Technology, Bachelor in Computer Application, Diploma in Computer Engineering, and Diploma in Pharmacy.

DSEU Siri Fort Campus
World Class Skill Centre (WCSC) was changed to DSEU Siri Fort Campus. The WCSC was established by Government of NCT of Delhi in 2013. This campus is located in Siri Fort, South Delhi.

It offers B.A. in Aesthetics & Beauty Therapy and B.A. in Digital Media & Design.

Kasturba DSEU Pitampura Campus
DSEU Pitampura Campus was previously known as  Kasturba Institute of Technology for Women and was established in 1986 by Government of NCT of Delhi. It is located in Pitampura, North West Delhi.

These are all the courses offered at this campus: Diploma in Civil Engineering, Diploma in Computer Engineering, Diploma in Electronics Engineering, and Diploma in Fashion Design.

Meerabai DSEU Maharani Bagh Campus
DSEU Maharani Bagh Campus, formerly known as Meerabai Institute of Technology (MIT Delhi), was established in 1962  by Government of NCT of Delhi. It is located at Maharani Bagh, South East Delhi.

The courses offered at Meerabai DSEU Maharani Bagh Campus are B.Sc. in Medical Laboratory Technology, Diploma in Applied Arts, Diploma in Cosmetology & Health, Diploma in Electronics Engineering, Diploma in Interior Design, and Diploma in Pharmacy.

DSEU Rajokri Campus
Rajokari Institute of Technology (RIT) was renamed to DSEU Rajokri Campus after its affiliation to DSEU. It was established by Government of NCT of Delhi in 2016. It is located in Rajokri, New Delhi.

The courses offered at this campus include BMS in e-Commerce Operations, BMS in Land Transportation, and Diploma in Computer Engineering.

DSEU Vivek Vihar Campus
DSEU Vivek Vihar Campus was formerly known as World Class Skill Centre (WCSC) and was established in 2013 by Government of NCT of Delhi. It is located in Vivek Vihar, Shahdara.

The only two courses offered by DSEU Vivek Vihar Campus are B.Com. in Business Process Management and BBA in Retail Management.

DSEU Wazirpur-I Campus
DSEU Wazirpur Campus, formerly known as Delhi Institute of Tool Engineering, was established by Government of NCT of Delhi in 2007. It is located in Wazirpur, North West Delhi.

DSEU Wazirpur-I Campus offers only two courses which are as follows: Diploma in Mechanical Engineering and Diploma in Tool & Die Making.

Organisation and administration

Governance
The governing officials of the university include the Chancellor, the Vice Chancellor, the Pro-Vice Chancellors, the first members of the Court, the Board of Management, the Academic Council and the Finance Committee of the university.

The President of India is the Visitor of the Delhi Skill and Entrepreneurship University. The Lieutenant Governor of Delhi is the Chancellor of the university. The Vice-Chancellor is appointed by the Chancellor. The Chancellor is the nominal head of the university and the Vice-Chancellor is the executive head of the university.

Schools
DSEU has its courses divided over 12 schools which are as follows:
School of Retail Management
School of Engineering Sciences/ Applied Engineering
School of Sustainability
School of Beauty and Wellness
School of Languages
School of Logistics and Supply Chain
School of Innovation and Entrepreneurship
School of Allied Medical Services
School of Creative Economy
School of IT & ITeS
School of Employability and Wholistic Development
School of Banking, Financial Services and Insurance

Courses offered
DSEU offers 15 full-time diploma courses, 4 part-time diploma courses, 14 lateral entry diploma courses, 18 undergraduate courses and 2 postgraduate courses.

Diploma Courses
These are the various diploma courses offered at DSEU:

Full time diploma
Diploma in Applied Arts
Diploma in Architecture
Diploma in Automobile Engineering
Diploma in Chemical Engineering
Diploma in Civil Engineering
Diploma in Computer Engineering
Diploma in Cosmetology & Health
Diploma in Electrical Engineering
Diploma in Electronics Engineering
Diploma in Fashion Design
Diploma in Interior Design
Diploma in Mechanical Engineering
Diploma in Pharmacy
Diploma in Printing Technology
Diploma in Tool and Die Making

Part time diploma
Diploma in Automobile Engineering(Part Time)
Diploma in Civil Engineering(Part Time)
Diploma In Electrical Engineering(Part Time)
Diploma in Mechanical Engineering(Part Time)

Lateral entry diploma
Diploma in Applied Arts (Lateral Entry)
Diploma in Architectural Assistantship (Lateral Entry)
Diploma in Automobile Engineering (Lateral Entry)
Diploma in Chemical Engineering (Lateral Entry)
Diploma in Civil Engineering (Lateral Entry)
Diploma in Computer Engineering (Lateral Entry)
Diploma in Electrical Engineering (Lateral Entry)
Diploma in Electronics & Communication Engineering (Lateral Entry)
Diploma in Fashion Design (Lateral Entry)
Diploma in Interior Design (Lateral Entry)
Diploma in Mechanical Engineering (Lateral Entry)
Diploma in Printing Technology (Lateral Entry)
Diploma in Tool and Die Making (Lateral Entry)

Undergraduate Courses
There are 18 undergraduate courses (3 B.A, 2 B.Sc, B.Com, 3 BBA, 2 BMS, BCA and 6 B.Tech) offered by DSEU. The complete list is as follows:

B.A. (Spanish)
B.A. (Digital Media & Design)
B.A. (Aesthetics and Beauty Therapy)
B.Sc. (Data Analytics)
B.Sc. (Medical Laboratory Technology)
B.Com. (Business Process Management)
BBA (Retail Management)
BBA (Facilities and Hygiene Management)
BBA (Banking, Financial Services and Insurance)
BMS (e-Commerce Operations)
BMS (Land Transportation)
BCA (Bachelor of Computer Application)
B. Tech. (Mechanical & Automation Engineering)
B.Tech. (Electronics & Communication Engineering)
B.Tech. (Computer Science Engineering)
B. Tech. (Mechanical Engineering)
B.Tech. (Tool Engineering)
B.Tech. (Mechatronics Engineering)

Postgraduate Courses
Apart from diploma and undergraduate courses, DSEU also offers two postgraduate courses. These two courses are:
M.Tech (Tool Engineering)
MCA (Masters in Computer Applications)

Sports
On August 12, 2021, Manish Sisodia, Deputy Chief Minister and Education Minister of Delhi, announced on Twitter that Delhi Skill and Entrepreneurship University will organise a skill competition in the city and train the winning candidates for the World Skills Competition, popularly known as the 'Olympics of Skills' to be held at Shanghai in 2022.

He wrote: Delhi Skill and Entrepreneurship University will host the first ever state level Skill Competition in Delhi.
This competition will identify & prepare contenders for World Skill International Competition also known as Olympics of skills to be held in Shanghai 2022

See also
 List of institutions of higher education in Delhi

References

External links
 

Educational institutions established in 2020
Universities and colleges in Delhi
Medical Council of India
Distance education institutions based in India
2020 establishments in Delhi
 
Universities established in the 2020s